Sclerolaena tetracuspis, the brigalow burr or dog burr, is a species of flowering plant in the family Amaranthaceae, native to eastern Australia. It is an intricately branched, sprawling perennial shrub typically found growing in heavy soils.

References

tetracuspis
Endemic flora of Australia
Flora of Queensland
Flora of New South Wales
Plants described in 1978